John Molloy is the name of:

John Molloy (Australian settler), early settler in Western Australia (1786–1867) husband of Georgiana Molloy 
John Patrick Molloy (1873–1948), Canadian veterinarian and politician
John Molloy (priest) (died 1922), Archdeacon of Raphoe from 1900
John Molloy (musician) (1960-2018), British musician and game designer.